Michael Grunwald (born August 16, 1970) is an American journalist and author who writes about public policy and national politics. He worked as a journalist for The Boston Globe, The Washington Post and Time. He is presently a senior writer for Politico Magazine.

He is the author of two widely acclaimed books, The Swamp: The Everglades, Florida and the Politics of Paradise (2006) and The New New Deal: The Hidden Story of Change in the Obama Era (2012). He is currently working on a book for Simon & Schuster about food, land and climate change.

Life and career

Education and occupation 
Grunwald graduated from Harvard University in 1992. He started his career as a metro reporter for The Boston Globe, then joined The Washington Post, where he served as a national reporter, New York bureau chief and outlook essayist; he wrote the Washington Post'''s lead news story on the September 11 attacks. In 2007, he became a senior national correspondent for Time, where he wrote cover stories on topics like the future of California, the decline of the Republican Party, and 2009 Person of the Year Ben Bernanke. HIs cover story about the policy roots of the Hurricane Katrina disaster won a $50,000 award from the Understanding Government Foundation; he donated the award to New Orleans charities. His 2012 cover story "One Nation Subsidized" used his own daily life in Miami as well as government data to make the case that "most Americans are makers and takers, proud of our making, blind to our taking." Grunwald was also a provocative columnist at Time, defending the failed Solyndra loan and arguing against tax deductions for charitable donations.

Grunwald joined Politico Magazine in 2014, where he helped start the public policy site The Agenda. He has mostly written forPolitico Magazine about wonky topics like the federal government's dysfunctional $3 trillion portfolio of credit programs, the failure of U.S. transportation policy and President Obama's policy legacy. He has also written longform political stories about the 2016 campaign, America's political culture wars, and the growth of Trumpism through the Florida retirement community The Villages.

 Books 
Grunwald wrote his first book, The Swamp: The Everglades, Florida, and the Politics of Paradise (2007) after doing a four-part series for The Washington Post in 2002. It's the story of man and nature on the Florida peninsula, focusing on the steady destruction and troubled attempted restoration of the Everglades, and it's still considered one of the indispensable histories of Florida. Grunwald also wrote the foreword to the Marjorie Stoneman Douglas classic about the Everglades, RIver of Grass.

His next book was The New New Deal: The Hidden Story of Change in the Obama Era (2012), was a NYT best-seller, the inside story of the Obama administration and its response to the Great Recession. It is about the Obama administration and its response to the financial crisis of 2007–2008. In that book, he describes the discussions and debates that led to the government's anti-recession measures such as the American Recovery and Reinvestment Act of 2009 (ARRA). Taking a positive review of the President's efforts, Grunwald defends the economic measures as full of important, long-term investments while charging Republican Party opponents as being hypocritical and self-serving.

Grunwald was also the ghostwriter for Obama Treasury Secretary Timothy Geithner's memoir about the 2008 financial crisis, Stress Test. Grunwald has been criticized for some of his own writings defending the government's response to the crisis, like his critique of the film The Big Short and his critique of Bernie Sanders' plan to break up big banks.

 Personal life 
Raised in Greenvale, New York, Grunwald resides in Miami with his wife Cristina Dominguez, a lawyer who is now the executive director of Sai Aryurvedic Institute, and their two children. 

 Awards 
Grunwald has also won numerous journalism awards, including the George Polk Awards for National Reporting and the Worth Bingham Prize for investigative reporting. The Swamp and The New New Deal'' both received the gold medal for non-fiction in the Florida Book Awards.

Twitter controversy 
In 2011, Grunwald posted a message on Twitter that he did not care that Anwar al-Awlaki, an American citizen, was killed in a drone strike by the US government, in 2011. In August 2013, Grunwald's tweet "I can't wait to write a defense of the drone strike that takes out Julian Assange," a criticism of the WikiLeaks founder, caused widespread outrage. Grunwald quickly tweeted his regrets: "It was a dumb tweet. I'm sorry. I deserve the backlash."

References

Further reading 
 Westcott, Kathryn. "Healing Florida's 'River of Grass'", BBC News, 25 June 2008. Accessed 19 August 2013.

External links 
 Personal website
Grunwald on Time

1970 births
Living people
American male journalists
Harvard College alumni
People from Greenville (town), New York
Journalists from New York (state)